Baldwin Township is a civil township of Iosco County in the U.S. state of Michigan.  As of the 2000 census, the township population was 1,726.

Geography

Demographics
As of the census of 2000, there were 1,726 people, 754 households, and 523 families residing in the township. The racial makeup of the township was 96.99% White, 0.23% African American, 1.10% Native American, 0.70% Asian, 0.12% Pacific Islander, and 0.87% from two or more races. Hispanic or Latino of any race were 0.81% of the population.

There were 754 households, out of which 24.0% had children under the age of 18 living with them, 58.0% were married couples living together, 8.1% had a female householder with no husband present, and 30.6% were non-families. 25.6% of all households were made up of individuals, and 11.4% had someone living alone who was 65 years of age or older.  The average household size was 2.28 and the average family size was 2.71.

In the township the population was spread out, with 21.1% under the age of 18, 6.0% from 18 to 24, 21.0% from 25 to 44, 30.8% from 45 to 64, and 21.1% who were 65 years of age or older.  The median age was 47 years. For every 100 females, there were 99.5 males.  For every 100 females age 18 and over, there were 93.0 males.

The median income for a household in the township was $29,783, and the median income for a family was $33,889. Males had a median income of $29,952 versus $21,615 for females. The per capita income for the township was $17,367.  About 7.9% of families and 9.2% of the population were below the poverty line, including 9.5% of those under age 18 and 8.7% of those age 65 or over.

References

External links
Baldwin Township

Townships in Iosco County, Michigan
Townships in Michigan
Populated places on Lake Huron in the United States